Hassan Arianfard (born 18 October 1948) also known as Hassan Fard is an Iranian former cyclist. He competed at the 1976 Summer Olympics.

References

External links
 

1948 births
Living people
Iranian male cyclists
Olympic cyclists of Iran
Cyclists at the 1976 Summer Olympics
Place of birth missing (living people)
Asian Games gold medalists for Iran
Asian Games silver medalists for Iran
Asian Games bronze medalists for Iran
Asian Games medalists in cycling
Cyclists at the 1970 Asian Games
Cyclists at the 1974 Asian Games
Medalists at the 1970 Asian Games
Medalists at the 1974 Asian Games
20th-century Iranian people